The 2022 UEFA European Under-17 Championship (also known as UEFA Under-17 Euro 2022) was the 19th UEFA European Under-17 Championship (38th edition if the Under-16 era is also included), the annual international youth football championship organised by UEFA for the men's under-17 national teams of Europe. Israel was hosting the tournament. A total of 16 teams played in the tournament, with players born on or after 1 January 2005 eligible to participate.

Netherlands, having won the title in 2018 and 2019, were the two-times title holders, since the 2020 and 2021 editions were cancelled due to the COVID-19 pandemic in Europe and the title was not awarded.

Host selection
The timeline of host selection was as follows:
11 January 2019: bidding procedure launched
28 February 2019: deadline to express interest
27 March 2019: Announcement by UEFA that declaration of interest were received from 17 member associations to host one of the UEFA national team youth final tournaments (UEFA European Under-19 Championship, UEFA Women's Under-19 Championship, UEFA European Under-17 Championship, UEFA Women's Under-17 Championship) in 2021 and 2022 (although it was not specified which association were interested in which tournament)
28 June 2019: Submission of bid dossiers
24 September 2019: Selection of successful host associations by the UEFA Executive Committee at its meeting in Ljubljana

For the UEFA European Under-17 Championship final tournaments of 2021 and 2022, Cyprus and Israel were selected as hosts respectively.

Qualification

All 55 UEFA nations entered the competition, and with the hosts Israel qualifying automatically, the other 54 teams will compete in the qualifying competition, which will consist of two rounds: Qualifying round, which will take place in autumn 2021, and Elite round, which will take place in spring 2022, to determine the remaining 15 spots in the final tournament. The draw for the qualifying round was held on 9 December 2020 at the UEFA headquarters in Nyon, Switzerland.

Qualified teams
The following teams qualified for the final tournament.

Note: All appearance statistics include only U-17 era (since 2002).

Notes
1 The best seven runners-up among all eight elite round groups qualified for the final tournament.
2 Two as Serbia and Montenegro and six as Serbia
3 As Serbia and Montenegro

Final draw
The winner and runners-up of Group 6 were not known at the time of the draw.

Venues
The tournament is hosted in five venues:

Match officials
The following officials were appointed for the final tournament:

Referees
 Henrik Nalbandyan
 Christian-Petru Ciochirca
 Dario Bel
 Willy Delajod
 Helgi Mikael Jónasson
 Igor Stojčevski
 Andrei Florin Chivulete
 Tom Owen

Assistant referees
 Khachatur Hovhannisyan
 Maximilian Weiß
 Miroslav Maksimov
 Luka Pušić
 Matěj Vlček
 Sander Saga
 Erwan Finjean
 Gylfi Már Sigurðsson
 Daniel Vasilevski
 Isaak Elias Skjeseth Bashevkin
 Alexandru Cerei
 Johnathon Bryant

Fourth officials
 Juxhin Xhaja
 David Fuxman
 Snir Levi
 Jasmin Šabotić

Squads

Group stage
The final tournament schedule was announced on 31 March 2022.

The group winners and runners-up advance to the quarter-finals.

Group A

Group B

Group C

Group D

Knockout stage
The schedule for the knockout stage was released on 26 April 2022.

Bracket

Quarter-finals
The quarter-finals took place on 25 May and 26 May.

Semi-finals
The semi-finals took place on 29 May.

Final
The final took place on 1 June.

Goalscorers

References

External links

2022
Under-17 Championship
2022 Uefa European Under-17 Championship

2022 in youth association football
UEFA
UEFA
Sports events affected by the 2022 Russian invasion of Ukraine